State leaders in the 11th century BC – State leaders in the 9th century BC – State leaders by year

This is a list of state leaders in the 10th century BC (1000–901 BC).

Africa: Northeast

Egypt: Third Intermediate Period

Twenty-first Dynasty of the Third Intermediate Period (complete list) –
Amenemope, Pharaoh (1001–992 BC)
Osorkon the Elder, Pharaoh (992–986 BC)
Siamun, Pharaoh (986–967 BC)
Psusennes II, Pharaoh (967–943 BC)

Twenty-second Dynasty of the Third Intermediate Period (complete list) –
Shoshenq I, Pharaoh (943–922 BC)
Osorkon I, Pharaoh (922–887 BC)

Kush

Kingdom of Kush (complete list) –
Kandake Makeda, King (c.1005–950 BC)
Aserkamani, King (c.950 BC–?)

Asia

Asia: East

China
Zhou, China: Western Zhou (complete list) –
Kang, King (c.1020–996 BC)
Zhao, King (c.977/975–957 BC)
Mu, King (c.977–922 BC)
Gong, King (c.922–900 BC)

Asia: Southeast
Vietnam
Hồng Bàng dynasty (complete list) –
Mậu line, (c.968–c.854 BC)
Kỷ line, (c.853–c.755 BC)

Asia: West

Kingdom of united Israel –
These chronologies are as established by Albright
David, King (1000–962 BC)
Solomon, King (962–922 BC)

Kingdom of Judah –
Rehoboam, King (922–915 BC)
Abijah, King (915–913 BC)
Asa, King (913–873 BC)

Kingdom of (northern) Israel –
Jeroboam I, King (922–901 BC)
Nadab, King (901–900 BC)

Tyre, Phoenecia –
Abibaal, King (993–981 BC) 
Hiram I, King (980–947 BC), contemporary of David and Solomon 
Baal-Eser I, King (946–930 BC) 
Abdastartus, King (929–921 BC) 
Astartus, King (920–901 BC)  

Assyria: Middle Assyrian Period —
Ashur-rabi II, King (c.1013–972 BC) 
Ashur-resh-ishi II, King (c.972–967 BC) 
Tiglath-Pileser II, King (c.967–935 BC) 
Ashur-Dan II, King (c.935–912 BC) 

Assyria: Neo-Assyrian Period —
Adad-nirari II, King (912–891 BC)

Dynasty VI of Babylon —
Eulmash-shakin-shumi, King (c.1004–987 BC)
Ninurta-kudurri-usur I, King (c.987–985 BC)
Shirikti-shuqamuna, King (c.985 BC)

Dynasty VII of Babylon —
Mar-biti-apla-usur, King (c.985–979 BC)

Dynasty VIII of Babylon —
Nabu-mukin-apli, King (c.979–943 BC)

Dynasty IX of Babylon —
Ninurta-kudurri-usur II, King (c.943 BC)
Mar-biti-ahhe-iddina, King (c.943–920 BC)
Shamash-mudammiq, King (c.920–900 BC)

Elam: Shutrukid dynasty (complete list) –
Mar-biti-apla-usur, King (pre-983–post-978 BC)

Europe: Balkans

Athens: Life archons (complete list) –
Archippus, Archon (1012–993 BC)
Thersippus, Archon (993–952 BC)
Phorbas, Archon (952–BC)
Megacles, Archon (922–892 BC)

Sparta (complete list) –
Agiad dynasty
Eurysthenes (c.930 BC)
Agis I (c.930–900 BC)
Eurypontid dynasty
Procles (c.930 BC)

References

State Leaders
-
10th-century BC rulers